An imaging agent may refer to:
Contrast medium, which absorbs or alters external electromagnetism or ultrasound
Radiopharmaceutical, which emits radiation